Kaarlo Johannes ("Hannes") Torpo (21 January 1901 – 10 September 1980) was a Finnish track and field athlete who competed in the 1924 Summer Olympics. He was born in Keikyä, Pirkanmaa and died in Helsinki. In 1924, he finished fourth in the shot put competition.

References

External links
profile

1901 births
1980 deaths
People from Sastamala
Finnish male shot putters
Olympic athletes of Finland
Athletes (track and field) at the 1924 Summer Olympics
Sportspeople from Pirkanmaa
20th-century Finnish people